Rishu Movies Bhojpuri is a Bhojpuri language 24x7 movie channel that was owned by Captain Video Pvt Ltd. This channel shows Bhojpuri movies and movies dubbed in Bhojpuri.

References

External links 
 Official facebook page of Rishu Bhojpuri

Hindi-language television channels in India
Television channels and stations established in 2021
Television stations in Mumbai
Hindi-language television stations
Companies based in Mumbai
Movie channels in India